Andrea Bonatti (born 6 August 1984) is an Italian professional football coach who last was in charge of Serie C club Triestina.

Career 
His career started in 2008 as athletic trainer for Lumezzane for two years. He continued with the same role with Crotone, Grosseto and Salernitana. In February 2015, he received a professional coach's licence. Afterwards, he became Leonardo Menichini's assistant coach at Salernitana. In 2016, he was signed by Lazio to train their under-19s after Simone Inzaghi's promotion as first-team manager. He led the Giovani Aquile to a first place in the Group A of the 2016–17 Campionato Primavera, being eliminated by Roma at the quarter-finals. On 3 February 2018, he was sacked after his team had been placed at the penultimate place. In 2019, he was appointed to train the Juventus' under-16s. In August 2020, he was promoted to the under-19s. With them, he reached the semi-finals of 2021–22 UEFA Youth League, their best-ever placing in the competition. In summer 2022, he was sacked and was appointed to train Triestina. He was sacked on 10 October 2022, following a negative start of the season.

References 

Living people
1984 births
Italian football managers
U.S. Triestina Calcio 1918 managers
Serie C managers
People from Brescia